is a railway station in the heart of the city of Gifu, Gifu Prefecture, Japan, operated by Central Japan Railway Company (JR Central).

Lines
It is also the terminal station for  the Takayama Main Line. Along with Nishi-Gifu Station and Nagamori Station, it is one of the three JR Central stations in the city of Gifu.

Station layout
The station consists of three elevated island platforms serving six tracks for the Tōkaidō Main Line and Takayama Main Line, with the station building underneath. The station has a Midori no Madoguchi staffed ticket office.

Platforms

Adjacent stations

History

The station first opened on January 21, 1887, named  and was primarily used for the transport of goods. On December 15, 1888, it became a passenger rail station, at which point its name was changed to Gifu Station. On July 22, 1913, the former Aichi Station building, which closed in 1909, was moved to the area that is now the south side of Gifu Station. This station was used until it was burned to the ground during the firebombings of Gifu City in 1945. On April 1, 1987, it became part of JR Central. On November 1, 1986, construction of the elevated rail lines began, with construction ending on March 2, 1996. The station was extensively remodelled in 2008.

Station numbering was introduced to the section of the Tōkaidō Line operated JR Central as well as the Takayama Main Line in March 2018; Gifu Station was assigned station number CA74 for the Tōkaidō Main Line and CG00 for the Takayama Main Line.

Passenger statistics
In fiscal 2016, the station was used by an average of 31,742 passengers daily (boarding passengers only).

Surrounding area
Meitetsu Gifu Station

Bus services
On the north side of JR Gifu Station are bus boarding platforms for all of the bus lines belonging to Gifu Bus, Co., Ltd. There are 15 bus boarding platforms in all, with 12 serving bus lines to different parts of Gifu and its surrounding municipalities. The first two platforms are only for alighting and the last one is currently not being used.

See also
 List of railway stations in Japan

References

External links

  

Railway stations in Japan opened in 1887
Buildings and structures in Gifu
Railway stations in Gifu Prefecture
Stations of Central Japan Railway Company
Tōkaidō Main Line
Takayama Main Line